Hernán Ruquet (born 1 January 1990) is an  Argentine ex professional footballer who played as a defender for Comunicaciones.

Career
Ruquet's career started in Primera B Metropolitana with Almagro. Six goals in a total of ninety appearances arrived across seven campaigns from 2009–10, with the defender appearing thirty-two times in 2015 as they won promotion to Primera B Nacional. Having appeared four times in the second tier, Ruquet went back to Primera B Metropolitana with Comunicaciones on 20 July 2016. He made his debut versus Acassuso on 21 August, before scoring his first goals in October against UAI Urquiza and Fénix respectively. Ruquet departed to spend 2017–18 with Almirante Brown, prior to rejoining Comunicaciones ahead of the 2018–19 season.

Career statistics
.

References

External links

1990 births
Living people
Footballers from Buenos Aires
Argentine footballers
Association football defenders
Primera B Metropolitana players
Primera Nacional players
Club Almagro players
Club Comunicaciones footballers
Club Almirante Brown footballers